Tyler Colie Willis Avary (born January 2, 1980) is a beauty queen from Brownfield, Texas who has competed in the Miss USA pageant. She was born to James & Joetta Warren Willis. She has one sister named Kaci.

Miss Texas USA 2005
Willis won the Miss Texas USA 2005 title in a state pageant held in Laredo, Texas in June 2004.  Competing against 128 other contestants as Miss Central Plains, Willis also won the Miss Congeniality title during the event.  Her second runner-up was Lauren Lanning, who would win the title the following year.
This was Willis's fourth attempt at winning the title.  Her first came in 2001, when she competed as Miss Raiderland and did not place.  The following year she won the Miss Lubbock USA title in April and competed in the Miss Texas USA 2002 pageant held in July.  In that pageant, she made the semi-finals.  In 2003, she competed as Miss Northwest Texas in the 2004 pageant, and placed first runner-up, her highest placement before winning the title in 2005.

Miss USA 2005
Willis represented Texas in the Miss USA 2005 pageant broadcast live from Baltimore, Maryland in April 2005.  She placed in the top 15 of the nationally televised pageant, Texas' fifth consecutive placement at the pageant, and also won the Miss Photogenic award.  The competition was won by Chelsea Cooley of North Carolina.

Personal life
Willis has completed bachelor's and master's degrees from Texas Tech University. She wed Blake Avary, brother of Bryce Avary of The Rocket Summer in January 2008 and currently works for an advertising agency, Warren Douglas.

References

Tyler Willis is also a business teacher in Tappen, North Dakota.

External links
Miss Texas USA official website
  Miss USA Official Profile (Internet Archive Cache)

Living people
People from Brownfield, Texas
Miss USA 2005 delegates
Miss Photogenic at Miss USA
Texas Tech University alumni
1980 births